Yovon (Tajik: Ёвон) is a town in Tajikistan located in the Khatlon Region. The population of the town is 36,700 (January 2020 estimate).

History

Geography

Climate
Yovon has a hot-summer Mediterranean climate (Köppen climate classification Csa).

References

External links
Satellite map at Maplandia.com

Populated places in Khatlon Region
Cities in Central Asia